Wuori Township is a township in Saint Louis County, Minnesota, United States. The population was 572 at the 2010 census.

U.S. Highway 53 and State Highway 169 (MN 169) are two of the main routes in the township.

Wuori Township is located immediately north of the city of Virginia.

The unincorporated community of Florenton is located within Wuori Township.  Britt is nearby.

A majority of Wuori Township is located within the Superior National Forest.  The Laurentian Continental Divide Recreation Area is located within Wuori Township on Highway 53.  The recreation area serves as the trailhead for the Lookout Mountain Trail system.

Etymology
Wuori is a name derived from the Finnish language, meaning "mountain".

Geography

Wuori Creek flows through the northeast corner of Wuori Township.

The Sandy River flows through the north–central part of Wuori Township, and the Sandy River also flows near the northwest boundary line of the township.

Adjacent townships, cities, and communities
The following are adjacent to Wuori Township:

 The city of Virginia (south)
 The city of Mountain Iron (west and southwest)
 Sandy Township (north)
 The unincorporated area of Britt (north and northwest)
 Sand Lake Unorganized Territory (northwest)
 Hay Lake Unorganized Territory (east)
 Pike Township (northeast)

Unincorporated communities
 Florenton

Demographics
As of the census of 2000, there were 563 people, 219 households, and 173 families residing in the township.  The population density was 16.2 people per square mile (6.3/km).  There were 231 housing units at an average density of 6.6/sq mi (2.6/km).  The racial makeup of the township was 98.22% White, 0.89% Native American, 0.36% Asian, and 0.53% from two or more races. Hispanic or Latino of any race were 0.71% of the population.

There were 219 households, out of which 33.3% had children under the age of 18 living with them, 68.9% were married couples living together, 7.8% had a female householder with no husband present, and 21.0% were non-families. 16.0% of all households were made up of individuals, and 4.6% had someone living alone who was 65 years of age or older.  The average household size was 2.57 and the average family size was 2.91.

In the township the population was spread out, with 22.6% under the age of 18, 9.1% from 18 to 24, 25.0% from 25 to 44, 34.3% from 45 to 64, and 9.1% who were 65 years of age or older.  The median age was 42 years. For every 100 females, there were 108.5 males.  For every 100 females age 18 and over, there were 108.6 males.

The median income for a household in the township was $45,694, and the median income for a family was $50,469. Males had a median income of $41,667 versus $21,528 for females. The per capita income for the township was $19,070.  About 3.1% of families and 3.9% of the population were below the poverty line, including 6.7% of those under age 18 and 5.7% of those age 65 or over.

References

Townships in St. Louis County, Minnesota
Townships in Minnesota